David John Harman, known professionally as Dave Dee (17 December 1941 – 9 January 2009), was an English singer-songwriter, musician, A&R manager, fundraiser and businessman. He was the frontman for the 1960s pop band Dave Dee, Dozy, Beaky, Mick & Tich.

Early life 
Dave Dee was born in Salisbury, Wiltshire and attended Adcroft School of Building, Trowbridge. Upon leaving school he became a police cadet with the Wiltshire Constabulary and as such was one of the first on the scene of the April 1960 car crash that resulted in the death of Eddie Cochran and serious injury to Gene Vincent. He later recounted that he started learning to play the guitar using Cochran's impounded Gretsch over several nights at the station.

He became a professional musician in 1962. His first group was called 'Dave Dee and the Bostons', who toured the UK and Germany and were a support act to The Honeycombs in 1964. Known for their variety act, which included comedy routines and risque comments interspersed amongst the song, the band came to the notice of Ken Howard and Alan Blaikley, changed their name to Dave Dee, Dozy, Beaky, Mick and Tich, and were signed to Fontana Records, with whom they had a string of hits between 1966 and 1969.

Dave Dee, Dozy, Beaky, Mick and Tich

Later career and death
Dee left the band to become a solo artist in September 1969, and released the single "My Woman's Man" which reached No. 42 in the UK and No. 58 in Australia. He issued six further solo singles through the end of 1971, all of which failed to chart, and played a Hells Angel in the Marty Feldman comedy film Every Home Should Have One in 1970. He then retired from performing and became an A&R Manager for Atlantic, Magnet and WEA Records, during which period he was at least partly responsible for their signing AC/DC, Boney M and Gary Numan. He also played himself (billed as 'Record Executive') in the 1980 Sex Pistols mockumentary film The Great Rock 'n' Roll Swindle. He eventually reunited with Dozy, Beaky, Micky and Tich for a 1974 single, and then later produced (but did not appear on) a 1979 single done by the DBMT quartet.  He later began performing live gigs with the band, and continued to record occasionally both with DDDBMT and as a solo act.  He issued his only solo album, Unfinished Business, in 1995.

Dee also became a businessman and founder committee member for disadvantaged children through the charity Nordoff-Robbins, which he helped found and worked with for over 30 years. He also became a magistrate. In his later years he lived in Mobberley, Cheshire, and fathered twin sons and a daughter. He suffered from prostate cancer in early 2001, but continued to perform with his band almost until his death from that disease in Kingston Hospital, Surrey, on 9 January 2009. He was 67.

References

External links
 The Band's official website
 

1941 births
2009 deaths
English male singers
English songwriters
English pop singers
Deaths from cancer in England
Deaths from prostate cancer
People from Salisbury
A&R people
British police officers
20th-century English singers
Musicians from Wiltshire
20th-century British male singers
20th-century English businesspeople
British male songwriters